One Week to Save Your Marriage is an American reality television series hosted by psychotherapist Dr. Robi Ludwig on TLC. Dr. Robi Ludwig counsels married couples who are desperate to rescue their relationships.

Episode list

Season 1: 2006

Season 2: 2007

Reception
Common Sense Media rated the show 2 out of 5 stars.

References

External links
One Week to Save Your Marriage at the official TLC website 

2006 American television series debuts
2007 American television series endings
2000s American reality television series
English-language television shows
TLC (TV network) original programming